In Euclidean geometry, Carnot's theorem states that the sum of the signed distances from the circumcenter D to the sides of an arbitrary triangle ABC is 

where r is the inradius and R is the circumradius of the triangle. Here the sign of the distances is taken to be negative if and only if the open line segment DX (X = F, G, H) lies completely outside the triangle. In the diagram, DF is negative and both DG and DH are positive.

The theorem is named after Lazare Carnot (1753–1823). It is used in a proof of the Japanese theorem for concyclic polygons.

References
Claudi Alsina, Roger B. Nelsen: When Less is More: Visualizing Basic Inequalities. MAA, 2009, p.99
Frédéric Perrier: Carnot's Theorem in Trigonometric Disguise. The Mathematical Gazette, Volume 91, No. 520 (March, 2007), pp. 115–117 (JSTOR)
David Richeson: The Japanese Theorem for Nonconvex Polygons – Carnot's Theorem. Convergence, December 2013

External links
 
 Carnot's Theorem at cut-the-knot
 Carnot's Theorem by Chris Boucher.  The Wolfram Demonstrations Project.

Theorems about triangles and circles